Walt Dziedzic (November 29, 1932 – November 24, 2018) was an American politician who served on the Minneapolis city council from 1976 until his retirement in 2010. Prior to entering politics, Dziedzic spent 50 years as a police officer and inspector. He was also a Commissioner of the Minneapolis Park and Recreation Board.

Biography 
Dziedzic grew up in the community of Northeast, Minneapolis and attended Edison High School, where he was an all-city athlete and earned nine letters in football, baseball, and hockey. He served in the United States Army during the Korean War, and was present at Panmunjom when the Korean Armistice Agreement was signed.

He played professional baseball for the Brooklyn Dodgers for three seasons before attending the College of St. Thomas. After graduation, he taught at DeLaSalle High School during the 1960–61 school year. He married Patricia McCarthy before joining the Minneapolis Police Department. During his 16 years as an officer, he worked his way up from Inspector of Police, then lieutenant investigator, and later burglary detective.

In 1976, Dziedzic ran for an open First Ward council seat. He served on the Minneapolis city council representing Northeast, Minneapolis for 22 years. He then served on the Park Board for another 12 years where he convinced Jim Lupient to develop a waterpark in Northeast Minneapolis later named Jim Lupient Waterpark. He was co-founder of Art A Whirl and founder of "Seniors Day at the Dome." Dziedzic worked to create the Quarry Shopping Center, the largest retail development in Minneapolis outside of downtown at the time of its construction in the late 1990s.

Dziedzic had six children, three boys and three girls. His daughter, Kari Dziedzic, was elected to the Minnesota Senate in a January 2012 special election. His son, Joe Dziedzic, played two years in the National Hockey League for the Pittsburgh Penguins.

On November 24, 2018, Dziedzic died of natural causes at the North Memorial Medical Center. He was 85.

References

1932 births
2018 deaths
Politicians from Minneapolis
Military personnel from Minneapolis
University of St. Thomas (Minnesota) alumni
Brooklyn Dodgers players
Baseball players from Minneapolis
American police officers
Minneapolis City Council members
Minnesota Democrats
Edison High School (Minnesota) alumni